Wilber Hardee (August 15, 1918 – June 20, 2008) was an American businessman who founded the American fast-food restaurant chain Hardee's, located mostly in the Midwest and Southeast regions.

Biography
Hardee was born in Martin County, North Carolina, on August 15, 1918. His first name is commonly misspelled as Wilbur, but  Wilber is the way he spelled it himself. Raised on his family's farm, he eventually left the family business to become a musician and later a grill cook. Hardee joined the United States Navy during World War II, but upon his uncle's death, he returned to the United States. After returning he met and married Kathryn Roebuck in 1945.

With his wife, he opened a series of restaurants and inns in North Carolina, including the Do Drop Inn, the Port Terminal Inn, and the Silo Restaurant. He studied the things that the public seemed to respond to the most at existing quick-serve restaurants at the time and an idea formed that would evolve into the first Hardee's restaurant concept. On September 3, 1960, he opened the first Hardee's location in Greenville, NC.

Hardee died in his home town of Greenville, North Carolina, on June 20, 2008, and was cremated two days later. His cremains are inurned in Greenville at Pinewood Memorial Park in the Floral Garden 4 Section.

See also
 Burger Chef
 Carl's Jr.
 CKE Restaurants

References

External links
 
 The Hardee's Story

1918 births
2008 deaths
CKE Restaurants
American food industry business executives
Fast-food chain founders
People from Martin County, North Carolina
20th-century American businesspeople
People from Greenville, North Carolina
United States Navy personnel of World War II